Following a croquet course run by Enfield London Borough Council, those completing the course were offered the chance to form a club, and in 1991 Enfield Croquet Club was established in Bush Hill Park recreation ground, between Lincoln Road and Southbury Road, in the London Borough of Enfield.

At first only association croquet was played, but later in 2005 golf croquet was introduced.  The club currently has three full size lawns and its members compete in various inter-club association and golf croquet competitions around the south east of England.

The club is a full member of the Croquet Association, the national governing body for the sport.

References

External links 
  Enfield Croquet Club website

Croquet in the United Kingdom
Croquet in England
Clubs and societies in London
Sports venues in London
Croquet clubs